Taty  may refer to:

People

Names
Anastasia (given name), nicknamed "Taty"
Tatiana (given name), nicknamed "Taty"

Given named, nicknamed
Taty Forbes (born 1997) U.S. softball player
Taty Mbungu, soccer player for Zaire
Taty Sumirah (1952–2020) Indonesian badminton player

Surnamed
Nilson Taty (born 1987) Sao Tomean soccer player

Other people
Tạ Tỵ (1922–2004) Vietnamese artist

Music
t.A.T.u.
 Taty (song), 2015 single by Markus Riva

Other uses
Vizier (Ancient Egypt) (also romanized taty)
Setipinna taty (S. taty), a species of anchovy

See also

 
 Taytay (disambiguation)
Surnames of Congolese origin